In 2016, nine U.S. states proposed cannabis reform legislation for medical marijuana and non-medical adult use. , the state laws are still at odds with the Federal status of cannabis, which is classified as a Schedule I narcotic. The Los Angeles Times stated that if all the measures passed, nine states encompassing a quarter of the U.S. population would have legalized recreational use, and "The presence of legalization measures on the ballot in Arkansas and North Dakota — both staunchly conservative states — illustrate the power of the trend toward legalization" and Federal reforms on banking are "increasingly looking inevitable".

References

External links
Congressional Affairs, September 2016 National Institute on Drug Abuse (NIDA)

Cannabis reform proposals 2016
Cannabis reform 2016

2016 United States
Reform proposals 2016